Fort Morgan is a historic masonry pentagonal bastion fort at the mouth of Mobile Bay, Alabama, United States.  Named for Revolutionary War hero Daniel Morgan, it was built on the site of the earlier Fort Bowyer, an earthen and stockade type fortification involved in the final land battles of the War of 1812.  Construction was completed in 1834 and it received its first garrison in March of the same year.

Fort Morgan is at the tip of Mobile Point at the western terminus of State Route 180 (Alabama). It and Dauphin Island, on which Fort Gaines is situated, enclose Mobile Bay.  The Alabama Historical Commission maintains the site.

War of 1812

After the departure of the Spanish from Mobile in April 1813, the Americans built an earth and wood redoubt on Mobile Point, ultimately naming it Fort Bowyer after Col. John Bowyer, who completed the construction before leaving in 1814. In September 1814 the fort withstood a British naval and land attack, known as the First Battle of Fort Bowyer. The British returned in February 1815 after their defeat at the Battle of New Orleans and again launched an attack that became known as the Second Battle of Fort Bowyer. This time they were successful, with its American garrison surrendering the fort. Before the British could continue their attack towards Mobile they received word that the Treaty of Ghent, ending the war, had been signed on Christmas Eve, 1814. When word of the treaty's ratification arrived shortly thereafter, the British withdrew. The site was a logical one for a more substantial fort that could defend itself from landward and protect the entrance to the bay, leading to Fort Morgan replacing Fort Bowyer.

Construction
After the War of 1812, the U.S. began a program to strengthen its seacoast defenses. As part of this program, in 1818 the U.S. contracted with Benjamin Hopkins of Vermont to build a large masonry fort on Mobile Point after a design by Simon Bernard, who had been a military engineer for Napoleon. However, Hopkins died a year later in a yellow fever epidemic, having accomplished little. The next contractor, Samuel Hawkins of New York, died in 1821, before accomplishing anything on the project.  The Army turned the task over to the Corps of Engineers under Capt. R.E. De Russey. Using slave labor, DeRussey was able to make some progress before he took ill in 1825 and turned the work over to his deputy, Lieut. Cornelius Ogden.  Ogden completed the work in March 1834 and turned the fort over to Capt. F.S. Belton, commander of Company B, 2nd US Artillery. This unit remained at the fort for about a year and a half before its transfer to Florida to assist in the Second Seminole War. Multiple concrete arches are embedded into the walls of Fort Morgan from the beginning of the American Civil War to today.

Civil War
Eight days before Alabama seceded from the Union, Col. John B. Todd took four companies of Alabama volunteers and captured the fort before dawn on 3 January 1861. The Confederates then proceeded to strengthen the defenses of Mobile Bay. The key point was the Main Ship Channel opposite Fort Morgan as this was the only approach where the water was deep enough to permit major warships to pass. To defend this area, the Confederates placed 18 of the fort's heaviest guns (including two 7-inch Brooke rifles and two British-made 8-inch Blakely rifles), so that they could bear on the Channel. They also built redoubts and trenches east of the fort to impede further any attack via land.

During the war, Fort Morgan provided protective fire for blockade runners. All 17 vessels that ran out of the Bay eluded capture, as did 19 of the 21 that attempted to enter. Union soldiers were observed in the Sand Island Lighthouse, spying on Fort Morgan, and the fort fired on the position destroying the lighthouse.

During the Battle of Mobile Bay on August 5, 1864, Union naval forces under Admiral David G. Farragut were able to get past Fort Morgan and enter the Bay. They captured Tennessee and Selma, forced the beaching and burning of Gaines, and captured Fort Gaines. This freed the Union land forces under Gordon Granger to besiege Fort Morgan. After two weeks of bombardment from sea and land, Major Richard L. Page, commander of the fort, felt compelled to surrender, which he did on August 23, 1864, after first spiking the fort's guns.  During the siege, the wooden roof of the Citadel, a ten-sided barracks located in the center of the fort used to house the enlisted men, caught fire and the structure was badly damaged. Rather than restore it, post-War crews used the ruins as a brick source for repairing the fort. The remains of the Citadel were razed in the 1880s for use as a breakwater.

Once the fort was in Union hands, the Union used it as a base for reconnaissance raids, and then as a staging area for the Battle of Spanish Fort and the Battle of Fort Blakely, which occurred days before General Robert E. Lee surrendered at Appomattox.

Late 19th century
During a renovation project in the 1870s, the fort received 12 200-pounder Parrott rifled cannons. Eventually, however, the US Government abandoned the fort, letting it fall into disrepair.  Then under the presidency of Grover Cleveland, Secretary of War William Endicott chaired the Endicott Board, which led to a program of building new, concrete batteries.  Between 1895 and 1900, Fort Morgan received five concrete batteries, supported by the latest in fire control, electricity, and communications.

The first battery, Battery Bowyer, was operational during the Spanish–American War. It had four 8-inch breech-loading guns on disappearing carriages. The battery was closed in 1917 and the guns removed for conversion to railway guns for service in Europe.

At the beginning of the Spanish–American War, Fort Morgan also received eight 10-inch smooth-bore muzzle-loading Rodman cannons, converted to 8-inch rifles with the insertion of a barrel sleeve. This was a makeshift and the Army later gave the guns away to cities for Civil War memorials.

The second battery, completed in 1900, was Battery Dearborn, named for Major General Henry Dearborn. The battery had eight breech-loading 12-inch coast defense mortars in two four-gun pits. The intent was that should enemy vessels approach, the mortars would rain down shells on the vessels' less heavily armored decks.

The third battery, also completed in 1900, was Battery Duportail, named for Major General Louis Duportail. Its armament consisted of two 12-inch breech-loading rifles on disappearing carriages. The battery was decommissioned in 1923. The Army removed the breechblocks and plugged the breeches before abandoning the guns in place. The Army scrapped the guns in the early 1940s.

The fourth battery was Battery Thomas, named for Captain Evan Thomas, who had been killed in the Battle of Sand Butte in 1873 during the Modoc War. This battery's armament consisted of two British 4.7-inch rapid-fire Armstrong guns. The battery's role was to prevent smaller enemy vessels from passing through the ship's channel in front of the fort. The battery was deactivated in 1917 and its guns removed.

The fifth battery was Battery Schenk, named for Lieutenant William T. Schenck, who was killed in action in Luzon in 1900 during the Philippine–American War. The battery initially held two, later increased to three, 3-inch rapid-fire guns. It too protected the ship channel.

20th century
Hurricanes in 1906 and in July 1916 caused a great deal of damage to the wooden houses at Fort Morgan along Officer's Row.  The wide porches that helped cool the buildings in summer proved particularly vulnerable.

In 1915, the Coast Artillery Corps built an experimental battery, called Battery Test, about a mile away from Fort Morgan. The battery held a single 10-inch gun on a disappearing carriage. The gun was removed shortly after the tests.

After the US declared war on Germany in April 1917, the fort took on the task of training men of the Coast Artillery in modern weapons.  The fort also trained field anti-aircraft batteries. In 1920 the fort received four British 9.2-inch howitzers. These guns were abandoned and later scrapped in 1924 when the Army abandoned the fort. Thereafter, the base deteriorated quickly.

During World War I, the Army had established a radio transmitting and receiving station at Fort Morgan as a part of a nationwide Morse-code communication network.  The transmitter had the call letters WUR. When Fort Morgan was abandoned, the call letters were transferred to Fort McClellan, Alabama.

In April 1942, the Army re-occupied the fort and constructed an adjacent airfield. Initially, the Coast Artillery brought five Model 1918 155mm (6.1-inch) guns to equip the fort. The Army placed two on top of Fort Morgan on mounts that permitted 360 degrees traverse. The remaining three guns stood on the fort's parade ground.

The War Department turned Fort Morgan over to the State of Alabama in 1946, and the Army again abandoned the fort in 1947. The War Department disbanded the U.S. Army Coast Artillery Corps itself in 1950.

Recent developments
Fort Morgan was designated a National Historic Landmark in 1960.

In 2007 it was listed as "one of the nation's 10 most endangered battle sites" by the Civil War Preservation Trust in History Under Siege: A Guide to America's Most Endangered Civil War Battlefields.

In June 2008, a 90-pound live Union naval shell was uncovered at the site. The shell was from a Parrott rifle on a U.S. Navy warship and was fired at the fort in the summer of 1864. The discovery came during excavations as part of a project meant to repair cracks in the walls.

See also
 List of National Historic Landmarks in Alabama

References

Further reading

External links

 
 "Fort Morgan and the Battle of Mobile Bay", a National Park Service Teaching with Historic Places (TwHP) lesson plan
 

1819 establishments in Alabama
National Register of Historic Places in Baldwin County, Alabama
Morgan
Morgan
National Historic Landmarks in Alabama
Alabama in the American Civil War
Military and war museums in Alabama
Museums in Baldwin County, Alabama
American Civil War museums in Alabama
Coastal artillery
Buildings and structures in Baldwin County, Alabama
Alabama State Historic Sites
Star forts
Coastal fortifications
Morgan
Historic American Buildings Survey in Alabama
American Civil War on the National Register of Historic Places
Military installations established in 1834
Military installations closed in 1947
Morgan
1947 disestablishments in Alabama